At the 2000 Summer Olympics, ten fencing events were contested. Men competed in both individual and team events for each of the three weapon types (épée, foil and sabre). Women competed in the foil and the épée events. The events took place at the Sydney Convention and Exhibition Centre.

Medal summary

Men's events

Women's events

Medal table
Italy finished top of the fencing medal table at the 2000 Summer Olympics.

Participating nations
A total of 217 fencers (134 men and 83 women) from 40 nations competed at the Sydney Games:

References

External links
Official Olympic Report

 
2000 Summer Olympics events
2000
2000 in fencing
International fencing competitions hosted by Australia